Jacques Adam Haitkin (born August 29, 1950, in Brooklyn, New York) is an American cinematographer. He is best known as the cinematographer for Wes Craven's slasher film A Nightmare on Elm Street.

Haitkin studied at the film school of New York University and American Film Institute, and graduated in 1975. He is well-known mainly as a horror film cinematographer, especially on films by Craven and Jack Sholder.

He also worked as additional or second unit director of photography on The Expendables, X-Men: First Class, X-Men: The Last Stand, Furious 7, Teenage Mutant Ninja Turtles: Out of the Shadows, Captain America: Civil War, Kong: Skull Island and The Fate of the Furious.

Filmography 
 Hot Dogs for Gauguin (1972)
 Hot Tomorrows (1977)
 They Went That-A-Way & That-A-Way (1978)
 The Prize Fighter (1979)
 The Hitter (1979)
 The Private Eyes (1980)
 The Girl, the Gold Watch & Everything (1980)
 St. Helens (1981)
 Galaxy of Terror (1981)
 The House Where Evil Dwells (1982)
 Last Plane Out (1983)
 Making the Grade (1984)
 A Nightmare on Elm Street (1984)
 The Lost Empire (1984)
 A Nightmare on Elm Street 2: Freddy's Revenge (1985)
 Quiet Cool (1986)
 The Hidden (1987)
 Cherry 2000 (1987)
 To Die For (1989)
 Cage (1989)
 Shocker (1989)
 The Ambulance (1990)
 Buried Alive (1990)
 Fast Getaway (1991)
 We're Talking Serious Money (1991)
 Mom and Dad Save the World (1992)
 Maniac Cop III: Badge of Silence (1993)
 Relentless 3 (1993)
 The Silence of the Hams (1994)
 Scanner Cop (1994)
 The Force (1994)
 Evolver (1995)
 Fist of the North Star (1995)
 Bloodsport II: The Next Kumite (1996)
 Buried Alive II (1997)
 Wishmaster (1997)
 Team Knight Rider (1997–1998) TV series, 14 episodes
 The Last Man on Planet Earth (1999)
 The Base (1999)
 The Apartment Complex (1999)
 The Chaos Factor (2000)
 Blowback (2000)
 Son of the Beach (2000) TV series, 3 episodes
 Faust: Love of the Damned (2000)
 Rocket's Red Glare (2000)
 A Month of Sundays (2001)
 Storm Watch (2002)
 Bad Karma (2002)
 Shut Up and Kiss Me (2004)
 Art Heist (2004)
 12 Days of Terror (2004)
 The Curse of El Charro (2005)
 The Haunting Hour: Don't Think About It (2007)
 Clean Break (2008) also story

References

External links 
 Official Site
 
 Jacques Haitkin – cinematographers.nl

American cinematographers
AFI Conservatory alumni
Tisch School of the Arts alumni
People from San Francisco
1950 births
Living people